The International Missionary Society of Seventh-Day Adventist Church Reform Movement (IMSSDARM) is an independent Protestant Christian denomination that split from the [[Seventh Day Adventist Movement in 1915.

IMSSDARM is a part of the Sabbatarian Adventist movement. The IMSSDARM headquarters is located in Cedartown, Georgia,.

History

World War I rupture in Adventist movement 
The IMSSDARM first appeared as a distinct organization in Denver, Colorado, USA, shortly after [World War I].

Adventist doctrine had historically condemned war and told its followers not to serve as soldiers. “The denomination of Christians calling themselves Seventh-day Adventist, taking the Bible as their rule of faith and practice are unanimous in their views that its teachings are contrary to the spirit and practice of war, hence they have ever been conscientiously opposed to bearing arms.” –Letter to Austin Blair, Governor of Michigan, August 3, 1864, (Signed) John Byington, J.N. Loughborough, Geo. W. Amadon, General Conference Committee.However, in 1914, the warring governments in Europe pressured the Adventist leadership to allow military service for their young men. This was the official statement issued by the church leadership in Germany:"Most honorable Lord General and Minister of War, August 4, 1914:

"…While we stand on the fundamentals of the Holy Scriptures, and seek to fulfill the precepts of Christendom, keeping the Rest Day (Saturday) that God established in the beginning, by endeavoring to put aside all work on that day, still in these times of stress, we have bound ourselves together in defense of the 'Fatherland,' and under these circum-stances we will also bear arms on Saturday (Sabbath)….” (Signed) “H.F. Schubert, President”

Approximately two percent of Seventh-day Adventist members in more than 16 European countries were disfellowshipped from the church for their open opposition to war and their support of pacifism. In some countries, entire congregations and their elders, within just one week, found themselves deprived of church membership because of their stand on the war question and the Sabbath. This later in 1925 became the Seventh day Adventist Reform Movement organization, in the city of Gotha, Germany.

Creation of The SDARM 
After World War I, disfellowshipped Adventists in Europe decided to temporarily organize so as to legally  hold representation before the SDA General Conference and hold their collective resources and support their ministers and workers

Since many disfellowshipped Adventists in Germany had worked with the International Missionary and Tract Society of the Seventh-day Adventist Church, they organized in 1919 in Germany as "Internationale Missionnsgesellshaft der Siebententags Adventisten Alte seit 1844 stehengebliebene Richtung Deutsche Union" (International Missionary Society of Seventh-day Adventists, old movement standing firm since 1844). The disfellowshipped brethren in the other European countries, organized themselves using a variety of other names.

Sending at least 16 representatives of these new organizations, unsuccessfully attempted in 1920 and 1922 to reconcile their differences with the Seventh-day Adventist Church.  At this point, the organization decided to continue independently from the Adventist Church.  This move was facilitated by the discovery that an Adventist reform movement had been prophesied.  These advent faith holders now were to become the SDARM

In July 1925, representatives from those 16 countries established the basis of their faith in the Principles of Faith document, choosing the name of Seventh Day Adventist Reform Movement, at the first official General Conference meeting in Gotha, Germany. Soon the SDARM began spreading the Gospel throughout North America, Africa, Latin America, and Asia.

In April 1936, the Nazi government confiscated all SDARM property in Germany.  Many German SDARM leaders and followers died in concentration camps.  Some of them were allegedly denounced by members and leaders of the Seventh-day Adventist Church.

Post war schism 
After 1945, the General Conference of the SDARM tried to settle the differences and discord with the leaders of our North American Union, that in 1927, the German missionaries sent to support the work of the church, had registered as IMSSDARM American Union. For some years they had held some doctrinal differences, added to their discord due to some GC leaders mismanagement, that unfortunately led to a schism.

During the 1948 SDARM General Conference Delegation Sessions held in the Hague, Netherlands, from July 5-15, 1948, these leaders were declared rebels, and letters of authorization were given for the acting new GC president and the Secretary to take on the duty of reorganizing our work in North America. After some settlement proposals from the new GC leaders and the rejection of the Denver based leaders, the matter was settled during the Saint Louis, Missouri's North American Union Conference held on March 4, 1949, chaired by Brother Karl Kozel, who strongly supported and signed the disfellowshipping of their three dissatisfied leaders. Unfortunately, an estimate of about 70 souls went out in their support.
In 1951, an internal SDARM GC delegation disagreements, gave way to another disruption among the leaders. The facts of some pastors that had committed adultery and that were allowed in their ministerial positions by the previous GC president with the knowledge of the acting GC president, came to light, added to some other money mismanagement from the current GC president and treasurer.
After much discussion and disagreement, two GC committee were elected, to seek a way of coming into a solution of the matter, in the new delegation session. These two committees were chaired by Pr. Karl Kozel, and by Pr. Dumitru Nicolici, correspondingly.

Within a few weeks, Mr. Kozel sued Mr. Nicolici before the California State Courts. On may, 1952, an agreement was achieved in court, where Mr. Kozel recognized the leadership of Mr. Nicolici. But, unfortunately, just a month later, on June 6, Mr Kozel and some of his followers decided to join the previous disfellowshipped IMS leaders. After this new breakaway, this group had set up its own separate organization, the International Missionary Society of the Seventh Day Adventist Reform Movement, with their new headquarters in Spele, Germany, and later in Mosbach, Germany.  These two organizations have unsuccessfully tried to unite in 1968, and 1993.

Current structure 
The organizational structure of IMSSDARM follows the original pattern of the Seventh-day Adventist Church. The denomination has churches, mission fields, districts, fields, unions, and the General Conference.

The highest governing body of the denomination, the General Conference Assembly, is composed of delegates from around the globe.  It meets in full session every five years to elect a 13-member governing Board.  The Board studies  doctrinal issues and establishes missionary priorities. The 2017 Assembly was held in Tortoreto, Italy.

The new international headquarters facility in Cedartown, Georgia, U.S.A., was purchased in 2007 and is staffed by ministers, doctors, teachers, and missionaries.  The Sabbath Watchman is the official publication.

IMSSDARM is represented in more than 100 countries.  It has approximately 35,000 members with more than 73,000 congregants attending weekly church services.

Doctrine 
IMSSDARM adherents worship on the seventh-day Sabbath (Saturday) and profess belief in Jesus Christ as Lord and Saviour. The organization holds the Bible to be inerrant and acknowledges the writings of Ellen G. White to be part of the Spirit of prophecy (inspired writings) for the last days.

IMSSDARM  attaches much importance to their name, historical roots, and Adventist doctrines. Points of difference with the Seventh-day Adventist Church, besides conscientious objection to war, include the view that abortion and homosexuality violate God's will, a refusal to participate in political activity, the upholding of the marriage institution as sacred before God, a refusal to participate in ecumenism and labor unions, and advocacy of health principles, such as vegetarianism and natural healing, while abstaining from alcohol, tobacco, and drugs.

The IMSSDARM states that it does not divide into different churches on the basis of language, ethnic, or racial differences.

References

3. You can also research visiting the Seventh Day Adventist Reform Movement web page.

External links
 General Conference - International Missionary Society 
 American Union - International Missionary Society - American Union
 Canadian Field - International Missionary Society Seventh-day Adventist Reform movement, Canadian Field | IMSSDARM, Adventist Library - IMS Media Online Library and Adventist Bookstore, The Reformation Messenger
 Japan Church - IMS セブンスデー・アドベンチスト教会

Charismatic Adventism
Seventh Day Adventist Reform Movement